Mughal artillery included a variety of cannons, rockets, and mines employed by the Mughal Empire.  This gunpowder technology played an important role in the formation and expansion of the empire.

History

Artillery was not widely employed in Central Asia prior to the 16th century, despite Chinese mortars having been known to the Mongols hundreds of years earlier.  Even some use of cannon at Hisar by the Timurid Sultan Husayn Mirza in 1496 did not lead to a substantial military role for artillery in India, nor did the presence of Portuguese ship's cannon at the 1509 Battle of Diu.  However, following the decisive Ottoman victory over the Safavid Empire at the 1514 Battle of Chaldiran, Babur incorporated artillery and Ottoman artillery tactics into his military.  Although authorities disagree about how many cannons he brought to India, Babur's artillery played a "key role" in the establishment of the Mughal Empire.  In 1526, the First Battle of Panipat saw the introduction of massed artillery tactics to Indian warfare.  Under the guidance of Ottoman gun master Ustad Ali Quli, Babur deployed cannons behind a screening row of carts.  Enemy commander Ibrahim Lodi was provoked into a frontal attack against Babur's position, allowing him to make ideal use of his firepower.  This tactic also panicked Lodi's elephant cavalry, beginning the end of elephant warfare as a dominant offensive strategy in India.  These new weapons and tactics were even more important against the more formidable army faced in the Battle of Khanwa the following year.

Artillery remained an important part of the Mughal military, in both field deployment and incorporation into defensive forts.  However, transportation of the extremely heavy guns remained problematic, even as weapon technology improved during the reign of Akbar.

Later emperors paid less attention to the technical aspects of artillery, allowing the Mughal Empire to gradually fall behind in weapon technology, although the degree to which this decline affected military operations is debated.  Under Aurangzeb, the Mughal technology remained superior to that of the breakaway Maratha, but traditional Mughal artillery tactics were difficult to employ against Maratha guerilla raids.  In 1652 and 1653, during the Mughal–Safavid War, prince Dara Shikoh was able to move light artillery through the Bolan Pass to assist in the siege of Qandahar.  But problems with the accuracy and reliability of the weapons, as well as the inherent defensive strengths of the fort, failed to produce a victory.  By the 18th century, the bronze guns of the declining empire were unable to compete with the standardized production of European cast-iron weapons and performed poorly against colonial forces, such as Jean Law de Lauriston's French troops.

Weaponry
The Mughal military employed a broad array of gunpowder weapons larger than personal firearms, from rockets and mobile guns to an enormous cannon, over 14 feet long, once described as the "largest piece of ordnance in the world."  This array of weapons was divided into heavy and light artillery.

Heavy artillery
Extremely heavy artillery was an important part of the Mughal military, especially under its early emperors.  Babur deployed guns capable of firing cannonballs weighing between 225 and 315 pounds against a 1527 siege, and had previously employed a cannon capable of firing a 540-pound stone ball.  Humayun did not field such massive artillery at the Battle of Kannauj in 1540, but still had heavy cannons, capable of firing 46 pound lead balls at a distance of one farsakh.  These large weapons were often given heroic names, such as Tiger Mouth (Sher Dahan), Lord Champion (Ghazi Khan), or Conqueror of the Army (Fath-i-Lashkar), and inscriptions, sometimes in verse.  They were not only weapons, but "real works of art".  Their artistry did not make them easier to move, however.  Rugged passes and water crossings were insurmountable barriers, and even when they could be moved, it was a slow process requiring sixteen or twenty oxen for relatively moderate cannons such as Humayun's.  Muhammad Azam Shah was forced to abandon his heavy artillery en route to the Battle of Jajau.  The largest such weapons, such as Muhammad Shah's "Fort Opener", required a team of "four elephants and thousands of oxen" and only rarely reached their siege targets.

Other heavy artillery included mortars and mines deployed by sappers against fortress walls.  Although these weapons had noticeable successes, such as the victory at the Siege of Chittorgarh in 1567, their preparation and deployment came at the cost of substantial Mughal losses.

Light artillery

Mughal light artillery, also known as artillery of the stirrup, consisted of a variety of smaller weapons.  Animal-borne swivel guns saw widespread use in several forms.  Elephants carried two pieces of "elephant barrel" (gajnal and hathnal) artillery and two soldiers to fire them.  The elephants served only to transport the weapons and their crew, however; they dismounted before firing.  "Camel guns" (Shutarnal) and "swivel guns" zamburak, on the other hand, were carried on camel-back and were fired while mounted.  Other light guns were mounted on wheeled carts, pulled by oxen or horses.

The mobile field artillery has been seen as the central military power of the Mughal empire distinguishing the Mughal troops from most of their enemies. A status symbol for the emperor, pieces of artillery would always accompany the Mughal emperor on his journeys through the empire. The Mughal artillery's main use in battle was to counter hostile war elephants which were common in warfare on the Indian subcontinent. But although emperor Akbar personally used to design gun carriages to improve the accuracy of his cannons, the Mughal artillery was most effective by scaring the opponent's elephants off the battlefield. The ensuing chaos in the hostile ranks would enable the Mughal armies to defeat the enemy's troops.

Grenadiers and rocket-bearing soldiers were also considered part of the Mughal light artillery.

See also

References

External links

Indo-Persian weaponry
Military of the Mughal Empire
Artillery of India
Warfare of the Early Modern period